This is a list of the members of the Australian House of Representatives in the 22nd Australian Parliament, which was elected at the 1955 election on 10 December 1955. Three new seats were created (Bonython, Bruce and Stirling) and two were abolished (Hoddle and Martin). The incumbent Liberal Party of Australia led by Prime Minister of Australia Robert Menzies with coalition partner the Country Party led by Arthur Fadden won an additional eleven seats, defeating the Australian Labor Party led by Herbert Evatt, which lost ten seats.

Notes

References

Members of Australian parliaments by term
20th-century Australian politicians